Nomi Lisa Stomphorst (born 23 August 1992) is a Dutch water polo player for GZC Donk and the Dutch national team.

She participated at the 2018 Women's European Water Polo Championship.

See also
 List of World Aquatics Championships medalists in water polo

References

1992 births
Living people
Dutch female water polo players
Water polo players at the 2020 Summer Olympics
Olympic water polo players of the Netherlands
21st-century Dutch women